Matthew Jensen (American, born 1980) is a conceptual landscape artist and photographer based in the Bronx, New York. His work has been exhibited in the Metropolitan Museum of Art and the National Gallery of Art. He currently teaches photography and art at Parsons School of Design at The New School in New York City.

Education 
Jensen received a BA in political science and fine art from Rice University in 2002 and an MFA in photography from the University of Connecticut in 2008.

Works and critical reception 
Jensen is the recipient of a Guggenheim Fellowship, Peter S. Reed Foundation Grant and his work has been twice received support from the National Endowment for the Arts.  His work has been described as exploring "our relationship to the natural world and ... environment."

Walking and mapping 
Jensen has designed public walks and free maps for  groups and venues, including: Open Spaces Kansas City, Green-Wood Cemetery, The High Line Art, Brooklyn Museum, and Visual Art Center of New Jersey.

References

External links 
 Official Website
 Paper Crown Press, online version of Park Wonder

American artists
1980 births
Living people
Rice University alumni
University of Connecticut alumni
Artists from the Bronx
Photographers from the Bronx